The 2015 FIBA Africa Under-16 Championship for Men (alternatively the Afrobasket U16) was the 4th U-16 FIBA Africa championship, organized by FIBA Africa and played under the auspices of the Fédération Internationale de Basketball, the basketball sport governing body and qualified for the 2016 FIBA Under-17 World Championship. The tournament was held from July 30 to August 8 at the Palais des sports à l’ACI 2000 in Bamako, Mali, contested by 11 national teams and won by Egypt.

Squads

Format
The 11 teams were divided into two groups (Groups A+B) for the preliminary round.
Round robin for the preliminary round; the top four teams advanced to the quarterfinals.
From there on a knockout system was used until the final.

Draw

Preliminary round
Times given below are in UTC.

Group A

Group B

Knockout stage 
All matches were played in: Palais des Sports à l’ACI 2000, Bamako

5th place bracket

Classification 9-11

Quarterfinals

Classification 5–8

Semifinals

Ninth place game

Seventh place game

Fifth place game

Bronze medal game

Gold medal game

Final standings

Egypt rosterAbdelrahman Abdelmaged, Ahmed Khalaf, Esam Mostafa, Hassan Elkhouga, Marwan Eesa, Mohamed Elsayed, Mohamed Hassan, Mohamed Ramadan, Mohamed Youssef, Omar Karkoura, Taref Raafat, Youssef Abdrabou, Coach: Bramislay Jeme

Awards

All-Tournament Team
 Sami Al Uariachi
 Ahmed Khalaf MVP
 Mostefa Braik
 Abdoulkarim Coulibaly
 Esam Mostafa

Statistical Leaders

Individual Tournament Highs

Points

Rebounds

Assists

2-point field goal percentage

3-point field goal percentage

Free throw percentage

Steals

Blocks

Turnovers

Individual Game Highs

Team Tournament Highs

Points

Rebounds

Assists

Steals

Blocks

Turnovers

2-point field goal percentage

3-point field goal percentage

Free throw percentage

Team Game highs

See also
 2016 FIBA Africa Under-18 Championship

External links
Official Website

References

2015
2015 FIBA Africa Under-16 Championship
2015 FIBA Africa Under-16 Championship
International basketball competitions hosted by Mali
July 2015 events in Africa
August 2015 sports events in Africa
July 2015 sports events in Africa